The Chastity Arch for Qiu Liang-gong's Mother is a paifang in Jincheng Township, Kinmen, Taiwan.

History
Qiu Liang-gong was born in Kinmen. His father died 35 days after his birth, leaving his mother alone to raise him. Her mother never remarried. Qiu grew up later to become a military officer in the navy. His mother was then honored and the arch was constructed for her in 1812.

Architecture
The arch is a four-pillar, three-section stone structure made of granite and limestone. There are four pairs of stone lions located at the front and back sides of the pillar.

See also
 List of tourist attractions in Taiwan

References

1812 establishments in China
Buildings and structures in Kinmen County
Gates in Taiwan
Jincheng Township
National monuments of Taiwan
Tourist attractions in Kinmen County